Arthur Guseni Oliver Mutambara (born 25 May 1966) is a Zimbabwean politician. He became the president of the Movement for Democratic Change (MDC) in February 2006. He has worked as a  director and CEO of Africa Technology and Business Institute since September 2003. Under a September 2008 power-sharing agreement, Mutambara served in the government as one of two Deputy Prime Ministers from 2009 to 2013.

Early activism
Mutambara was president of the Student Representative Council of the University of Zimbabwe in 1988 and 1989. He led anti-government protests at the University of Zimbabwe which led to his arrest and imprisonment. He was later educated on a Rhodes Scholarship in 1991, at Merton College, Oxford in the United Kingdom where he obtained a DPhil in Robotics and Mechatronics, and in the United States where he spent time as a visiting Fellow in the same field, including both California Institute of Technology, Massachusetts Institute of Technology and Florida A & M University – Florida State University College of Engineering. He also worked as a lecturer on Business Strategy and as a consultant for McKinsey & Company.

Mutambara criticised government ministers for abusing Zimbabwe's land reform program, engaging in: "monopolistic politics of domination, corruption, and petty bourgeois accumulation."

Mutambara, a self-professed admirer of Che Guevara, has also expressed his intention to visit Cuba to learn more about its "successful resistance" to American sanctions. Mutambara added: "We have a lot to learn from Cuba which started its revolution in 1959, we will continue with our solidarity, continue with the struggle and strengthen our co-operation."

Scholarly output
From March 2002 to September 2003, Mutambara was a professor of Operations Management at the University of South Africa's School of Business Leadership. Mutambara has authored at least two books. His most cited paper, of his at least thirteen papers, is entitled Estimation and control for a modular wheeled mobile robot co-authored with Professor Hugh F. Durrant-Whyte. According to Scopus as of 2013 his h-index was a modest 4.

Movement for Democratic Change
In 2005 the MDC split into two factions following a dispute over whether or not to participate in the March 2005 senatorial election. While MDC leader Morgan Tsvangirai, Mutambara, and others opposed participation, Welshman Ncube and Gibson Sibanda led a faction that favoured participation. Those supporting the senate elections won narrowly against the leader Morgan Tsvangirai's vote. Tsvangirai later overruled and overturned the decision of the plebiscite citing two absent members had sent in postal votes that canceled the slender margin.

In February 2006 at a Congress of the breakaway faction Movement for Democratic Change, Mutambara was elected as president of the party. Commenting on the election, Mutambara said, "My position was that the MDC should have boycotted those Senate elections. I guess then that makes me the anti-Senate leader of the pro-Senate MDC faction. How ridiculous can we get? That debate is now in the past, let us move on and unite our people."

The choice of Mutambara as leader was said to have been inspired by the fact that he is a Shona whereas Sibanda and Ncube are both Ndebele, but realised that only a Shona candidate could win an election across the whole of Zimbabwe. Mutambara is not a member of the House of Assembly.

The faction led by Tsvangirai described Mutambara's election as a nullity. In his MDC faction presidential acceptance speech, Mutambara stated, "We believe that our views on land reform in Zimbabwe are different from those of Western governments. Our approach is not driven by the interests of white farmers, but by those of all Zimbabweans, white and black. While we put the failure of the land reform program squarely on the ZANU–PF government, we also acknowledge the complicity of some Western governments which reneged on agreements, and the inertia of white farmers in seeking pre-emptive solutions." However, David Karimanzira, a leading member of the ZANU–PF, alleged that Mutambara was promoted by the West after Western governments decided not to continue backing Morgan Tsvangirai because the Zimbabwean people had allegedly rejected his party manifesto. He once called the African Union a "club of dictators".

Mutambara was arrested by the Zimbabwe police on 19 May 2006 while leading a march in support of his faction's candidate on the eve of the Budiriro by-election. He was also arrested on 11 March together with other MDC leaders from the other faction. He was released without charge two days later, only to be re-arrested on 18 March at Harare Airport en route to South Africa, where his family is still based, and where he is also a leading consultant. He was also released without charge after three days in custody.

2008 presidential election
After Mutambara and Tsvangirai failed to unite on a single MDC candidate for the March 2008 presidential election, Mutambara said on 15 February that he would not run for president and that his faction would instead back Simba Makoni. Mutambara instead ran in the concurrent parliamentary election for a seat from the Zengeza East constituency, but he was placed third, with 1,322 votes, according to official results, behind the candidate of the Tsvangirai faction, who won 7,570 votes, and the ZANU–PF candidate, who won 3,042 votes.

The Tsvangirai faction won 99 seats in the parliamentary election and the Mutambara faction won 10, compared with 97 for ZANU–PF. On 28 April 2008, Mutambara and Tsvangirai announced that their factions were reuniting, thus enabling the MDC to have a clear parliamentary majority.

On 1 June 2008, Mutambara was arrested at his home in Harare. According to his lawyer, the arrest was due to an article he wrote in The Standard in April, which allegedly included "falsehoods" and "contempt of court". In this article, he blamed Mugabe for the state of the economy and accused the security forces of committing abuses. On 3 June, Mutambara was released on a bail of 20 million Zimbabwean dollars but he did not go to jail, with the next court date being set for 17 June. After the hearing on 3 June, he described his own suffering as minor compared to that of the people, saying that Mugabe's "human rights violations" would fail and vowing, "We will triumph over evil."

SADC facilitated power-sharing agreement 
On 15 September 2008, the leaders of the 14-member Southern African Development Community witnessed the signing of a power-sharing agreement between the two MDC factions and ZANU-PF. Under the deal, Mugabe remained president, Tsvangirai became prime minister, the MDC controlled the police, ZANU-PF controlled the Army, and Mutambara became deputy prime minister.

References

External links

 Interview with Arthur Mutambara

1966 births
Alumni of Merton College, Oxford
Living people
Management consultants
McKinsey & Company people
Deputy Prime Ministers of Zimbabwe
Movement for Democratic Change – Mutambara politicians
University of Zimbabwe alumni
Zimbabwean Rhodes Scholars
Zimbabwean engineers
Roboticists